Tarielashvili is a Georgian Aristocratic family from Eastern Georgia.  Was a princely family of Russian Empire. The family were titled as the Princes of Tambov and Royal Aznauris of Kakheti. First family appear in the winery exchange document, dated back to 1693 year, where mentioned witness Mouravi Farsathan Tarielashvili. Family also included in the list of the Georgian nobility attached to the Russo-Georgian Treaty of Georgievsk of 1783. By decree of Tsar Nicholas II of Russian Empire, in 1915, Tarielashvili family received the princely title of the Russian Empire in the town of Tambov. According to the genealogical treatise by Prince Ioann of Georgia (1768–1830), the family came from region Anatolia. According to a family legend of the Tarielashvili, family descended from a Byzantine Greek noble of Anatolia, The ancestor of the family fled the Islamisation (Turkification) of Byzantine Empire and settled down in eastern Georgia, in the 14th century. His descendants being named as Tarielashvili, literally "the child of Darius/Dareios", after him.

Gallery

Literature
 Prince Ioan Bagration, Brief description of princely and noble families in Georgia - TB, 1997.  
 Winery exchange document of 1693.

References

Bagrationi, Ioane (1768–1830). Tarielashvili (კახეთის სამეფო აზნაურნი). The Brief Description of the Georgian Noble Houses. Retrieved on June 18, 2015.
The list of the nobility of the Qarthl-Kakhethi kingdom of Georgia of 1783 when between Georgia and Russia was concluded the Georgievskii Treaty N.257 Tarielashvili/Tarielishvili.
Tarielashvili Family

Noble families of Georgia (country)
Russian noble families